The people who are born in the City of São Paulo are called Paulistanos in Brazil, while the people who are born in State of São Paulo, independent of the city, are called as Paulistas. These people made extensive contributions to Brazil's (and the world's) history, culture, music, literature, education, science, and technology — particularly when São Paulo  was the federal capital and a great hub of Brazilian growth and innovation in all these areas. Some famous people born in the City or the State of São Paulo are:

 Gianne Albertoni (b. 1981) – top model
 Frida Alexandr (1906–1972) – Jewish author
 Sandra Annenberg (b. 1968) – journalist
 Luiz Cesar Barbieri (b. 1981) - footballer known as "Cesinha"
 Rubens Barrichello (b. 1972) – racing driver
 Yara Bernette (1920–2002) – Brazilian classical pianist
 Luciano Burti (b. 1975) – racing driver
 Lília Cabral (b. 1957) – actress
 Cafu (b. 1970) – football player
 Alice Piffer Canabrava (1911–2003) – economic historian
 Laura Cardoso (b. 1927) – actress
 Boris Casoy (b. 1941) – journalist
 César Cielo (b. 1987) - swimmer
 Abílio Diniz (b. 1936) – chairman and businessman
 Milene Domingues (b. 1979) – top model
 Elsie Dubugras (1904 – 2006) – journalist, medium, parapsychologist and plastic artist
 Eliana (b. 1973) – TV presenter
 Rodrigo Faro (b. 1973) – TV presenter and actor
 Vicente Feola (1909–1975) – football coach
 Christian Fittipaldi (b. 1971) – racing driver
 Emerson Fittipaldi (b. 1946) – racing driver
 Adriane Galisteu (b. 1973) – TV presenter
 Raul Gil (b. 1938) – TV presenter
 Luciana Gimenez (b. 1970) – TV presenter
 Yan Gomes (b. 1987) – Major League Baseball player
 Ailton Graça (b. 1964) – actor
 Beatriz Haddad Maia (b. 1996) - tennis player
 Alexandre Herchcovitch (b. 1971) – fashion designer
 Luciano Huck (b. 1971) – TV presenter
 Eder Jofre (b. 1936) – boxer
 Gilberto Kassab (b. 1960) – politician, mayor of São Paulo
 Andreas Kisser (b. 1968) – guitarist
 Felipe Kitadai (b. 1989) – Olympic medalist judoka
 Amyr Klink (b. 1955) – sailor
 Mike Krieger (b. 1986) – co-founder of Instagram 
 Rita Lee (b. 1947) – rock and roll singer
 Tiago Leifert (b. 1980) – journalist and TV presenter
 Paula Lima (b. 1970) – singer
 Anita Malfatti (1889–1964) – painter
 Paulo Maluf (b. 1931) – politician, governor of São Paulo
 Felipe Massa (b. 1981) – racing driver
 Marcos Mion (b. 1979) – TV presenter
 Eric Moxey (1894–1940) – R.A.F bomb disposal expert
 Marcio Navarro (b. 1978) – MMA fighter, former ISKA World champion kickboxer
 Alessandra Negrini (b. 1970) – actress
 Paolla Oliveira (b. 1982) – actress
 Marisa Orth (b. 1963)– actress
 José Carlos Pace (1944–1977) – racing driver
 Ernesto Paglia (b. 1959) – journalist
 Monalisa Perrone (b. 1969) – journalist
 Laura Pigossi (b. 1994) - tennis player
 Marcos Pontes (b. 1963) – astronaut
 Muricy Ramalho (b. 1955) – football coach
 Nando Reis (b. 1963) – singer
 Sérgio Reis (b. 1940) – singer
 Caio Ribeiro (b. 1975)– football player
 Suzane von Richthofen (b. 1983) – famous convicted murderer
 Maria Rita (b. 1977) – singer
 Rivelino (b. 1946) – football player
 Zé Roberto (b. 1974) – football player
 Ellen Rocche (b. 1979) – actress
 Cairo Santos (b. 1991) – American football player
 Djalma Santos (1929–2013) – football player
 Ricardo Semler (b. 1959) – entrepreneur
 Ayrton Senna (1960–1994) – racing driver
 Charles Oliveira (b. 1989) - MMA Fighter, Former UFC Lightweight Champion
 Alex Pereira (b. 1987) - MMA Fighter, Former Kickboxer Champion
 Anderson Silva (b. 1975) – MMA fighter
 Mauricio de Sousa (b. 1935) – cartoonist and businessman
 Aldir Mendes de Souza (1941–2007) – painter and physician
 Luisa Stefani (b. 1997) - tennis player
 Suzana Vieira (b. 1942) – actress
 Viola (b. 1969)– football player
 Eva Wilma (1933–2021) – actress
 Mariana Ximenes (b. 1981) – actress
 Chucri Zaidan (1891–1980) – physician received in 1966 the title of Paulistano Citizen of the Municipal Chamber of São Paulo.

References

!
Sao Paulo
People